Amblyseius martus is a species of mite in the family Phytoseiidae.

References

martus
Articles created by Qbugbot
Animals described in 1966